Lapidge is a surname. Notable people with the surname include:

Edward Lapidge (1779–1860), British architect
Michael Lapidge (born 1942), British scholar in the field of Medieval Latin literature